Astrogenes chrysograpta, is a species of moth in the family Tineidae. It was described by Edward Meyrick in 1921 using a specimen collected by Stella Hudson on Mount Arthur in January. This species is endemic to New Zealand.

References

Moths described in 1921
Tineidae
Moths of New Zealand
Endemic fauna of New Zealand
Taxa named by Edward Meyrick
Endemic moths of New Zealand